Comarnic is a town in Prahova County, Muntenia, Romania, with a population of 13,500. Four villages are administered by the town: Ghioșești, Podu Lung, Poiana and Posada.

The town is situated along the Prahova River, in the main on the left bank, but with some of the component villages on the right bank of the river.

Climate
Comarnic has a humid continental climate (Cfb in the Köppen climate classification).

Etymology
Its name origin is the Romanian word "comarnic" for a kind of a shepherd's hut,  of Slavic origin: komar=mosquito+ -nik, literally, "retreat from mosquitoes". It is used for milking sheep and storing milk and other dairy products.

Natives
Corina Drăgan-Terecoasa (born 1971), luger
Constantin Dragomir (born 1927), bobsledder
Georgeta Năpăruș  (1930–1997), painter
Ion Panțuru (1934–2016), bobsledder
David Popescu (1886–1955), general in World War II and Interior Minister

References

Towns in Romania
Populated places in Prahova County
Localities in Muntenia